The 1839 Whig National Convention was a presidential nominating convention held from December 4 to December 8 in Harrisburg, Pennsylvania. It was the first national convention ever held by the Whig Party, and was organized to select the party's nominee in the 1840 presidential election. The convention nominated former Senator William Henry Harrison of Ohio for president and former Senator John Tyler of Virginia for vice president.

After Daniel Webster dropped out of the race, the three leading candidates for the Whig nomination were General Harrison, who had been the most successful Whig candidate in the 1836 presidential election; General Winfield Scott, a hero of the War of 1812; and Senator Henry Clay, the Whigs' congressional and philosophical leader. With Southern delegates united behind him, Clay led on the first presidential ballot, but failed to win a majority. Harrison won the nomination on the fifth ballot after several delegates switched from supporting Clay or Scott. The convention chose Tyler, a Southerner and Clay supporter, to serve as Harrison's running mate. The Whig ticket went on to win the 1840 election, defeating incumbent Democratic President Martin Van Buren.

Presidential balloting 
Clay led on the first ballot, but circumstances conspired to deny him the nomination. First, the convention came on the heels of a string of Whig electoral losses, and party members were anxious to reverse the trend. Harrison managed to distance himself from the losses, but Clay, as the party's philosophical leader, could not. Had the convention been held in the spring of 1840, when the continuing economic downturn caused by the Panic of 1837 led to a string of Whig victories, Clay would have had much greater support. Second, the convention rules had been drawn up so that whoever won the majority of delegates from a given state would win all the votes from that state. This worked against Clay, who could have combined solid majority support in almost all the Southern delegations (with little potential for opponents to capitalize on a proportional distribution of delegates), and a large minority support in Northern delegations if the rules allowed counting of individual delegate votes. Third, several Southern states whose Whig party organizations supported Clay abstained from sending delegates to the convention.

Harrison won on the fifth ballot after Clay delegates from Illinois and Scott delegates from Michigan, New York, and Vermont combined to switch their support to Harrison. Writer and activist John Neal, who chaired the delegation from Maine, claimed to have been instrumental in convincing the powerful New York delegation to back Harrison prior to the final vote.
The state-by-state roll call was printed in the newspaper the Farmer's Cabinet on December 13, 1839:

Vice presidential nominee 
Because Harrison (born in Virginia) was considered a Northerner (as a resident of Ohio), the Whigs needed to balance the ticket with a Southerner. They also sought a Clay supporter to help unite the party. After being turned down by several potential candidates, including John J. Crittenden, John Bell, and Willie Person Mangum, the convention finally found its Southerner who had faithfully supported Clay and would accept: former Senator John Tyler. Tyler was well known to the delegates, having previously been the running mate of Hugh Lawson White and Willie Person Mangum during the four-way Whig campaign of 1836. He was easily nominated on the first ballot.

Aftermath 
During the balloting, Clay and Scott played cards with Whig politicians John J. Crittenden and George Evans at the Astor House hotel in New York City. When the group received word of Harrison's victory, Clay blamed his loss on Scott and struck him, with the blow landing on the shoulder which had been wounded during Scott's participation in the Battle of Lundy's Lane. Afterwards Clay had to be physically removed from the hotel room. Scott then sent Crittenden to Clay with Scott's challenge for a duel, but Crittenden reconciled them by convincing Clay to apologize.

See also 
 1840 Democratic National Convention
 U.S. presidential nomination convention
 1840 United States presidential election

References

Further reading 
 Holt, Michael F. The Rise and Fall of the American Whig Party: Jacksonian Politics and the Onset of the Civil War (1999)

Primary sources 
 Chester, Edward W A guide to political platforms (1977) online
 Porter, Kirk H. and Donald Bruce Johnson, eds. National party platforms, 1840-1964 (1965) online 1840-1956

External links 
 Proceedings of the Democratic Whig National Convention (1839)

1840 United States presidential election
Whig National Conventions
1839 in Pennsylvania
1839 conferences
Whig National Convention